This is a list of fictional spacecraft, starships and exo-atmospheric vessels that have been identified by name in notable published works of fiction. The term "spacecraft" is mainly used to refer to spacecraft that are real or conceived using present technology. The terms "spaceship" and "starship" are generally applied only to fictional space vehicles, usually those capable of transporting people.

Spaceships are often one of the key plot devices in science fiction. Numerous short stories and novels are built up around various ideas for spacecraft, and spacecraft have featured in many films and television series. Some hard science fiction books focus on the technical details of the craft. Some fictional spaceships have been referenced in the real world, notably Starship Enterprise from Star Trek which gave its name to Space Shuttle Enterprise and to the VSS Enterprise.
For other ships from Star Wars, Star Trek, Robotech, and other major franchises, see the separate lists linked below.

Space stations

Shuttles
(Planetary surface to orbit)
Moonrakers – Drax Industries NASA-style Space Shuttles featured in the 1979 James Bond film Moonraker and in the 2012 video game 007 Legends.
Orion III ("Pan Am Space Clipper") – a shuttle used to transport Dr. Heywood Floyd into space, in Arthur C. Clarke's and Stanley Kubrick’s 2001: A Space Odyssey
SSTO-TAV-37B Space Shuttlecraft – used in James Cameron’s 2009 film Avatar

Space Shuttle orbiters
Churchill – Lifeforce
Daedalus – Space Cowboys
Explorer – from the 2013 film Gravity
Excalibur – Henry Henshaw's shuttle in Superman comics. 
Intrepid – in Payne Harrison's novel Storming Intrepid
Odyssey – Odyssey 5
Pleiades – in David Brin's novel Earth
Roger – the anthropomorphic NASCA (a play on "NASA", "car" and "NASCAR") Space Shuttle orbiter in the Cars Toons episode "Moon Mater"
X-71 shuttles (Freedom and Independence) – specialized USAF Space Shuttle orbiters from the 1998 film Armageddon

Lunar
Aries Ib – passenger lunar lander in Arthur C. Clarke's and Stanley Kubrick's 2001: A Space Odyssey
 Eagle Transporter – Moonbase Alpha's modular service craft in Space: 1999
Friede – Moon rocket in 1929 German film Frau im Mond (Woman in the Moon)
 Mark IX Hawk – space fighter similar to the Eagle in Space: 1999
Mayflower One – Airplane II: The Sequel
Unnamed "projectile" – From the Earth to the Moon and Around the Moon by Jules Verne (1865)

Interplanetary

Aether — a large modular crewed spacecraft returning from a 2-year mission in the ongoing colonization of the fictional habitable Jovian moon X-13 in the 2020 movie The Midnight Sky
Anastasia — Dan Dare's personal ship
Bebop — titular ship of the series Cowboy Bebop
Bilkis – an experimental spaceship in the anime series Geneshaft
Cepheus — a ship made for transport between different bases and colonies in the deep Solar System in the movie Ad Astra.
Discovery One – a scientific research spacecraft sent to Jupiter in the novels: "2001: A Space Odyssey" and "2010: Odyssey Two" and the corresponding films: "2001: A Space Odyssey" (1968) and "2010: The Year We Make Contact" (1984).
Europa One – a scientific research spacecraft made to send astronauts to Jupiter’s moon Europa to find extraterrestrial life under the moons surface in Europa Report.
Lander – a ship used as a way to transport the crew of Europa One to the surface of Europa. It contains mining and recording materials to search for alien life under the surface of the moon.

Excelsior –  from the 1918 Danish film Himmelskibet (A Trip to Mars), "The film that marked the beginning of the space opera subgenre of science fiction." — Phil Hardy
F-302 Mongoose – air/space/hyperdrive strike craft in Stargate SG-1
Hermes – a reusable NASA spacecraft manufactured by the Jet Propulsion Laboratory for the Ares program to Mars in Andy Weir's and Ridley Scott's The Martian
MAV (Mars Ascent Vehicle) and MDV (Mars Descent Vehicle) landers – non-reusable landers used during the Ares missions
Hunter IV – personal fighter of Samus Aran from the Metroid series
Icarus I and Icarus II – spaceships from the 2007 movie Sunshine
Lewis & Clark – rescue ship sent to retrieve the Event Horizon
Mars I and Mars II – from the 2000 film Mission to Mars
unnamed modular Mars cycler spacecraft tethered to launch vehicle Kingfisher to create artificial gravity for the fictional 2-year Mars mission MTS-42 in the 2021 movie Stowaway
Messiah – an Orion spacecraft designed to prevent a comet hitting Earth in the 1998 film Deep Impact
Nightflyer – craft from the American horror science fiction television series Nightflyers
Odyssey – spacecraft designed to visit Saturn's moon Titan in the 2013 film Oblivion
Orbit Jet – United Worlds XV-2 Rocky Jones, Space Ranger, 1954 TV series
Rocinante – Martian corvette, centerpiece of The Expanse (TV series and novel series)
Rocket – from Little Einsteins
Ryvius – the title spacecraft from the anime series Infinite Ryvius
SA-43 Hammerhead Mk 1 – U.S.M.C. VTOL atmosphere/space fighter in 2063 Space: Above and Beyond, 1995 TV series
Scorpio E-X-1 – It's About Time
Serenity – an interplanetary spacecraft from the TV series Firefly and the 2005 science fiction movie Serenity
USS Cygnus – from Disney’s The Black Hole
Valley Forge – American Airlines space freighter, outfitted with geodesic dome greenhouses preserving the last forests in the 1972 film Silent Running
Zero-X – supermarionation film Thunderbirds Are Go

Interstellar

Military or exploration
Amaterasu (天照) – the third Freedom Guard Ship of the Kibi Planetary Nation (Starship Operators)
Arcadia (アルカディア号) – the most powerful space battleship in the Captain Harlock universe, created by Tochiro Oyama as his final gift to his friend Harlock before his inevitable demise
LCAM-01XA Archangel – a state-of-the-art warship from the anime Mobile Suit Gundam SEED & SEED Destiny. The first of its class, which it also takes its name from Archangel. She has a nearly identical sister-ship known as the Dominion. Both ships are named after the Hierarchy of angels, and had there been a 3rd sister-ship, she would've most likely been called the Seraphim.
Argonaut – the most advanced starship of the Iron Tribe in the anime series Heroic Age
Ark – a ship from Transformers. The flagship of the Autobots commanded by Optimus Prime in several Transformers series. The computer of the ship was called Teletraan I (voice provided by Casey Kasem), and it provided intelligence to the Autobots for their various missions. The original series saw it crashing on Earth several million years prior to 1984, and it was discovered some three million years before then by the characters of Beast Wars: Transformers. 
Aurora — Private starship owned by Alterra which had a mission of terraforming planets but was shot down when attempting a slingshot maneuver around planet 4546B. (From the Subnautica video game)Athena – starship which transports humans to a space station orbiting the planet Solaris in the 2002 film SolarisAvalon – the Homestead Company (also using Sony hardware) starliner in the film Passengers, which transports emigrates from the Earth to Homestead IIAxalon – A Maximal exploration ship in the Beast Wars: Transformers series Axiom – the Buy n' Large starliner in the films WALL-E and BURN-E, which is used, together with other starships, to provide a temporary home for humanity, but the originally planned 5-year cruise turns into a 700-year time period.Basroil – a starship commanded by Lafiel in the anime series Banner of the StarsBanner of the Stars – DVD 2: Basroil Unleashed!, Review by Jonathan Mays, Anime News Network, May 23, 2003.
Basestar – the Cylon capital ships in the Battlestar Galactica universeBellerophon – the ship that took colonists to Altair IV in Forbidden PlanetC-57D – the United Planets cruiser that was sent to the planet Altair IV in Forbidden PlanetConquistador – the largest battleship of the Henrietta Planetary Alliance (Starship Operators)Daban Urnud – interdimensional starship that visits the planet of Arbre in the Neil Stephenson novel AnathemDark Star"The Derelict" – the name given to the abandoned alien spacecraft discovered by the crew of the deep space tug Nostromo in the film Alien (1979)
  – The Predacon transwarp ship in the Beast Wars television series. The name was spelled with a y in the Beast Wars video game and in the DVD box set. In IDW Publishing's 2008 Beast Wars Sourcebook it was spelled "Darkside". The ship's computer was voiced by Elizabeth Carol Savenkoff.Destiny Ascension – an Asari dreadnaught with a crew of 10,000 that serves as the flagship of the Citadel fleet in the Mass Effect universeThe Most Defining Decisions You Have To Make In Mass Effect by András Neltz Kotaku.com, April 13, 2013.
EAS Agamemnon – (Babylon 5)Eltrium – Earth’s flagship of its interstellar fleet originally created as an evacuation ship in case of extraterrestrial attacks in Gunbuster.Endurance – NASA spacecraft/space station hybrid capable of traveling through wormholes, mothership to Rangers and Landers in InterstellarLander – two cargo spacecraft used in the Endurance mission to transport materials from the Endurance to Mann's planet; Lander 1 is later used by TARS to propel the craft far enough from SMBH Gargantua.
Ranger – various SSTO spaceplanes featured in Interstellar: the Ranger Test Article, piloted by Cooper during his crash; the twelve Rangers used during the Lazarus missions to carry astronauts through the wormhole to twelve potentially habitable planets; Ranger 1 and Ranger 2 used to carry personnel from the Endurance to Miller's, Mann's and Edmunds's planets (Ranger 2 is later used by Cooper like TARS's Lander); the futuristic Rangers, used around Saturn as the Cooper station's auxiliary craft (one is later stolen by Cooper and TARS to rejoin with Amelia on Edmunds's planet).Event Horizon –  gravity drive exploration starship, aiming to explore Proxima Centauri, disappears on its maiden voyage and rediscovered seven years later with its crew missing, a space-borne "Mary Celeste"Exelion – 12 kilometer long warship originally commissioned as Earth’s flagship in Gunbuster.Hyperion – the flagship of Jim Raynor in StarCraftISA Excalibur – Earth Alliance (Babylon 5)Icarus – near-light speed ship with onboard cryogenic chambers used to land astronauts on habitable worlds thousands of light years away to ensure the survival of the human race in Planet Of The Apes
Island Cluster Class Colonization Ship 25 (Macross Frontier) – Colony Fleet consisting on a transformable fighting ship, the main population vessel and other smaller islands from the anime Macross FrontierJupiter 2 – fictional nuclear-powered spacecraft from the television series Lost in Space (1965–68)Karrajor – a warship from the Cartoon Network series Megas XLR. It serves as a mothership for the squid-like alien race known as the Glorft.R.L.S. Legacy – a space exploration vessel from the Disney animated film Treasure Planet. It is a space ship that is designed to emulate a Sailing ship from the 1600s.Leonora Christine – colonization starship utilizing the fictional Bussard ramjet drive in the novel Tau Zero to create enough speed for onboard time dilation to occur so the passengers can reach the far away Beta Virginis star within their lifetime.Liberator – Blake's 7Libertad – a sub-light speed training ship in the anime series Strain: Strategic Armored InfantryMegazone – the title spaceship in the OVA series Megazone 23Minbari – Victory-class destroyer based on Vorlon technology from the Babylon 5 universeMurray Leinster – Destroyed at the beginning of the cult film StarcrashNautilus – flagship space yacht of International Transport Spacelines from Event[0]Nauvoo – A Mormon-owned religious space exploration generational ship in The Expanse used to travel a 100-year period to the star Tau Ceti.Nemesis – flagship of the Decepticons (Transformers)Nirvana – a supership from the anime series VandreadNormandy SR-1 – a Systems Alliance Navy frigate that serves as Commander Shepard's base of operations in the Mass Effect universeMass Effect's Normandy is far more than a space-age touring car, GamesRadar.com, July 20, 2015.
Normandy SR-2 – a larger and more advanced version of the original Normandy constructed by Cerberus that is assigned to Commander Shepard in the Mass Effect universe
NSEA Protector – a starship from the cult film Galaxy QuestOlympus Mons – flagship of the Settlement Defense Front fleet in Call of Duty: Infinite Warfare.Orbit Jet – winged-tail rocket ship (Rocky Jones, Space Ranger)Orion – saucer patrol craft in RaumpatrouillePrometheus – Weyland Corporation scientific vesselRaza – interstellar spaceship from the television series Dark MatterRed Dwarf – The titular spaceship from the BBC sci-fi comedy series Red DwarfRetribution – the only operational carrier after an SDF attack in Call of Duty: Infinite Warfare.
SDF-1 Macross – a massive interstellar transforming spacecraft from the anime Super Dimension Fortress Macross and its American adaptation, RobotechRodger Young – Corvette transport in the novel Starship TroopersSDF-3 Pioneer – the flagship of Admiral Rick Hunter in Robotech: The Shadow ChroniclesSearcher – space exploration vessel from the second season of Buck Rogers in the 25th CenturyShangri-La – the mothership of the Mu race in the manga and anime series Toward the Terra (地球へ… Terra e...)
Star Destroyer – capital ships used by the Galactic Republic, the Galactic Empire and the First Order and (very rarely) by the Rebel Alliance in the Star Wars universeStarship Tipton – a fictional re-imagining of the SS Tipton cruise liner from the Disney Channel Original Series The Suite Life on Deck. It serves as the main setting in a Star Trek-themed episode and it features Star Trek alum George Takei as a special guest.
USS Sulaco – Conestoga-class light assault carrier from the sequel AliensSwordbreaker – the mysterious spaceship owned by Kain Blueriver in the anime series Lost UniverseTerra V – Buzz Corey's space cruiser in Space PatrolTigris – the only operational destroyer after a massive attack by the SDF in Call of Duty: Infinite Warfare.Titan – the title spaceship in the movie Titan A.ETitan A.E., Review by Chris Vognar, Dallas Morning News, June 16, 2000. (retrieved on March 3, 2014).
UNSC Forward Unto Dawn – the Charon-class light frigate in the UNSC Navy commanded by Commander Miranda Keyes in Halo 3UNSC In Amber Clad – the Stalwart-class frigate in the UNSC Navy commanded by Commander Miranda Keyes in Halo 2
UNSC Infinity – the post-war flagship of the UNSC Navy in Halo 4, Halo 5: Guardians, and Halo Infinite. It was presumed destroyed in Halo Infinite by the BanishedUNSC Pillar of Autumn – the Halcyon-class cruiser in the UNSC Navy commanded by Captain Jacob Keyes in Halo: Combat Evolved
USG Ishimura – A planet-cracking mining vessel and the main setting of the first game of Dead Space. It is also referred to as the 'beginning of the Necromorph's takeover'.
USS Cerritos – the primary ship in Star Trek: Lower Decks; see Starfleet ships for more information.
USS Defiant – the name of three ships that feature in various Star Trek media. The most notable Defiant appears in Star Trek: Deep Space Nine from its introduction in the third season's premiere episode The Search until its destruction in the seventh season episode The Changing Face of Evil.
USS Discovery – the primary ship in Star Trek: Discovery, which travels instantaneously through space using a mycelial network; see Starfleet ships for more information.
USS Enterprise – various incarnations of a space exploration vessel from Star Trek; see Starfleet ships for more information
USS Orville – The titular vessel from the 2017–present TV series The Orville.
USS Protostar – the primary ship in Star Trek: Prodigy, which utilizes a protostar to travel considerably faster than conventional warp speed; see Starfleet ships for more information.
USS Saratoga – a space carrier in Space: Above and Beyond, aboard which serve the members of the U.S. Marine Corps Space Aviator Cavalry, 58th Squadron, or "Wildcards"
USS Voyager – the primary ship in Star Trek: Voyager; see Starfleet ships for more informationValkyrie – Titan A.E.Vanguard – generational ship from Robert A. Heinlein's Orphans of the SkyVenture Star – starship transporting humans to the moon Pandora in the 2009 film AvatarVonnegut – Spaceship transporting AIs of humans to the Proxima Centauri star system in the 2020 book Ready Player Two Silver Wings of Morning – starship owned by Purslane Gentian of the Gentian line in House of Suns. One of the fastest ships in that known universe.
Yamato (大和) – the title spaceship of the anime series Space Battleship YamatoKnown as The Argo in the American localized version.Yggdrasil – starship owned by the Templars and used for the transportation of the nine Pilgrims to the planet Hyperion in the 1990 Dan Simmons Novel HyperionSpace fighters
"Space fighters" are fictional spacecraft analogous to fighter aircraft. They are popular as the subjects of flight simulators, movies and books. The following are some examples of notable space fighters from various media franchises:

Babylon 5

The Earth Alliance (Starfury fighters)
SA-23E Aurora
SA-23J Thunderbolt
Raider Fighter
The Minbari FederationNial-class heavy fighter
The Narn RegimeFrazi-class fighter

The Centauri RepublicSentri-class medium fighter
The Shadows
Shadow fighter
The Vorlons
Vorlon fighter

Battlestar Galactica

The Twelve Colonies
Battlestars: (Actually aircraft carriers) originally 12, one for each colony, all destroyed except Galactica and Pegasus.
Colonial Viper
Colonial Viper MK. II
Colonial BlackbirdColonial Raptor
The Cylons
Cylon Raider
Cylon Heavy Raider

Buck Rogers in the 25th Century

The Earth Defense Directorate
Star Fighter
Hawk's Fighter

The Draconian Empire
Draconian Marauder

The Last Starfighter
Star League Gunstar

Space: Above and Beyond

The United States Marine Corps
SA-43 Hammerhead Endo/Exo-Atmospheric Attack Jet

The Chigs
Chig fighter

Space: 1999

TerrestrialMark IX HawkExtraterrestrial
Sidon warshipsGuardal CanalBethan and Deltan spacecraft

Stargate

Tau'ri/Earth (USAF fighters)
X-301
F-302
The Goa'uld
Death glider
Needle Threader

The Wraith
Wraith dart
The Ori
Ori fighter

Star Wars

In the Star Wars universe, a "starfighter" is a blanket term for all small combat space craft, regardless of shields, hyperspace capability, weaponry (unless it carries none), armor, maneuverability and crew. "Snubfighter" (a term first used in Star Wars), though no concise definition has been given, often refers to a fighter carrying shielding, secondary weapons systems such as proton torpedoes or concussion missiles, and being hyperspace capable. Starfighters sometimes bear mission designations similar to modern fighter aircraft, such as "strike fighter" and "space superiority fighter".

Galactic Republic
ARC-170 starfighter
V-19 Torrent starfighter
V-wing starfighter
Jedi starfighter
Jedi interceptor
Naboo starfighter
Rebel Alliance and New Republic
A-wing
B-wing
U-wing
X-wing
Y-wing
Galactic Empire and First Order
Various TIE fighter models
Confederacy of Independent Systems
Droid starfighter (Vulture droid)
Geonosian starfighter
Droid Tri-Fighter

Other propertiesAndromedaRF-42 Centaur Tactical FighterHaloUNSC C-709 Longsword Interceptor
UNSC YSS-1000 Sabre Space Superiority Fighter – notably, uses a Shuttle-style booster system for planetary launch
UNSC F-41 Broadsword Exo-atmospheric Multirole Strike FighterMarvel Cinematic UniverseDark Aster, the ship of Ronan the Accuser in Guardians of the GalaxyMilano, the ship of Peter Quill in Guardians of the Galaxy and Guardians of the Galaxy, Vol. 2. Replaced by a similar ship, the Benatar in Avengers: Infinity War, and Avengers: EndgameSanctuary II, the ship of Thanos in Thor: Ragnarok, Avengers: Infinity War, and Avengers: EndgameStatesman, the ship carrying surviving Asgardians to Earth in Thor: RagnarokTransportation
 Arcadia Class Jumpship (Destiny 2) The Arcadia Class Jumpship is the first ship the player gets access to and allows them to fly to other planets in the solar systemBretonia – Sleeper ship from the game FreelancerEagle 5 – SpaceballsElysium – PandorumEndeavour – from Rendezvous with Rama by Arthur C. Clarke, 1973; carried explorers to rendezvous with alien spacecraft RamaHispania – Sleeper ship from the game FreelancerHunter-Gratzner – Pitch BlackKusari – Sleeper ship from the game FreelancerLiberty – Sleeper ship from the game FreelancerMillennium Falcon – Star Wars universeNostromo – modified Lockmart CM-88B Bison Transport; commercial towing vessel from the film AlienOut of Band II (Oobii) – a freighter from the Zones of Thought series by Vernor Vinge, the main ship used by a multi-species crew to travel to a planet near the center of the galaxyPlanet Express Ship – FuturamaRama – Rendezvous with Rama by Arthur C. Clarke, 1973 (an alien spaceship, their name for it unknown)Rheinland – Sleeper ship from the game FreelancerThe Massive – Invader ZIMThe Resisty's Ship – Invader ZIMThe Void Ark – A prisoner transport from the video game Void BastardsVoot Runner  – Invader ZIMIntergalacticAndromeda Ascendant – Gene Roddenberry's AndromedaDeucalion – an enormous transforming spaceship over 63,000 km long from the anime series Kiddy GradeKiddy Grade #8: Emerging Anew, R2 DVD Reviews,Anime Vision, Monday, 14 November 2005.Destiny – the ship in which Stargate Universe takes place
Stargate ship types including the Daedalus-class battlecruiser of Earth, the O'Neill-class of the Asgard or the Aurora-class of the Lanteans.Hyperion – an 'ark' which carries 20,000 humans to the Andromeda Galaxy in Mass Effect: AndromedaPersonal spacecraftBetty – from Alien ResurrectionEEV – Bodenwerke Gemeinschaft Type 337 Emergency Escape Vehicle in the sequel Alien 3Escape pods – escape spacecraft often used in Star Wars (which in the first film were clearly inspired by the Apollo CSM)EVA pods – multi-functional vehicles (nicknamed "Alice", "Betty" and "Clara" during the Discovery One mission) used in 2001: A Space OdysseyNarcissus – modified Lockmart Starcub Light Intrasystem Shuttle; shuttlecraft for the Weyland-Yutani commercial hauler USCSS Nostromo in the film AlienPhoenix – first Earth spacecraft to achieve faster-than-light speed using warp drive; spaceship that instigated Earth's first contact with aliens in Star Trek: First Contact.S.T.E.V. – short for "Shuttle Transport Emergency Vessel", a single-person spacecraft featured in the video game Void Bastards.
SS Emporium – Taybor the Trader's spacecraft, featured in the Year Two Space: 1999 episode "The Taybor". The spaceship Emporium, inspired to the Mars Excursion Module, is equipped with a special Jump Drive engine, which allows it to travel between two points via teleportation in hyperspace.TARDIS (Time And Relative Dimension In Space) – various spacecraft-time machine hybrids equipped with some sort of jump drive featured on the television series Doctor Who. Many TARDIS versions are featured, the Doctor's one (a Type 40 TT Capsule) externally resembles a British police box.Tardis – the police box-resembling spacetime machine in the two spin-off Dr. Who films: Dr. Who and the Daleks and Daleks' Invasion Earth: 2150 A.D.''.

Lists of fictional spacecraft
List of fictional space stations
List of films featuring space stations
List of ships in Starship Operators
List of Space: 1999 vehicles
List of Star Wars starfighters
List of Star Wars spacecraft

See also
Bioship
Flying saucer
Foo fighter
Interstellar ark
Hyperspace
Non-rocket spacelaunch
Space dock
Space tourism
Spacecraft
Starship
Unidentified flying object
United States gravity control propulsion research (1955–1974)
Wormhole

References

External links
Starship Dimensions – graphic comparison of fictional spaceship sizes

 
Spacecraft
Spacecraft